Elikem Nutifafa Kuenyehia is a Ghanaian lawyer, author and chairman of Keystone Solicitors. He was formerly Chairman and partner at ENSafrica Ghana which was previously known as Oxford & Beaumont Solicitors.

Early life and education
Elikem attended the Achimota School for his senior high school education. He later attended the University of Oxford (Worcester College) to study Jurisprudence and after took a professional law course at University of Law which was known then as a College of Law in London.

He later had his Master in Business Administration in Entrepreneurship, Finance and Marketing at Northwestern University’s Kellogg School of Management.

Career
Elikem was trained as a Solicitor at The City of London office of Travers Smith to qualify as a Solicitor of the Senior Courts of England & Wales. He then moved to UK Linklaters LLP where he specialised in international banking and finance.

Elikem was appointment as Professor of Practice in January 2022 at the University of Buckingham Faculty of Business, Humanities and Social Science in the United Kingdom.

Arts
Elikem is the founder of the Kuenyehia Trust for Contemporary Art, organizers of the Kuenyehia Prize Awards and Exhibitions.

Awards and recognition
In 2010, Elikem was named a Young Global Leader by the World Economic Forum (WEF).

Other Activities
Elikem is author of Kuenyehia On Entrepreneurship and sits on the boards of the State Interests and Governance Authority  and Access Bank Ghana Plc.

References

Living people
Year of birth missing (living people)
21st-century Ghanaian lawyers
Alumni of Achimota School
Alumni of Worcester College, Oxford
Kellogg School of Management alumni
Academics of the University of Buckingham